The Liga Ecuatoriana de Baloncesto (abbreviated LEB) is the top professional basketball league in Ecuador. For sponsorship reasons the league is called the DirecTV Cup. The league is usually in session from June to October.

Current clubs

Champions

National Basketball League era (1999–2010)

LEB era (2011–present)

References

Sources
History

External links
Presentation at Latinbasket.com

Basketball competitions in Ecuador
Ecu